Pavel Šnobel was the defender of title; however, he lost to Evgeny Kirillov in the first round.
Lukáš Lacko became the new champion, after he beat Samuel Groth in the final (4–6, 7–5, 7–6(4)).

Seeds

Draw

Final four

Top half

Bottom half

References
 Main Draw
 Qualifying Draw

2009 ATP Challenger Tour
2009 Singles